A Fairer World Is Possible is a non-fiction book by Turkish president Recep Tayyip Erdogan which was published in seven languages in 2021.

Topic 
The book, which sets out with the doctrine "The world is bigger than 5", states that it is not right to leave it to the mercy of only the five countries in areas that will affect the future of the world. The book touches on the duties of the United Nations for a sustainable and fair world.

In the book; Global problems such as injustice, corruption, the refugee crisis, the world's spectacle of what is happening in the Middle East, international terrorism and Islamophobia are addressed.

References 

 
Turkish books